Aldous Bernard Hadden was a professional American football player for the Detroit Panthers, Providence Steam Roller, and Chicago Bears. He attended Washington & Jefferson College.

Notes

 

1899 births
1969 deaths
Sportspeople from Toledo, Ohio
Players of American football from Ohio
Washington & Jefferson Presidents football players
Detroit Panthers players
Providence Steam Roller players
Washington & Jefferson College alumni
Chicago Bears players